Shanghai Shixi High School, also known as Shanghai Shixi Middle School, is an experimental-model public high school founded in 1870 and is located in the Jing'an District of Shanghai, China.

Introduction 
Shanghai Shixi High School was one of the first experimental model high schools certified by Shanghai Municipal authorities. Founded in 1870, the school changed its name to "Shixi High School" in 1946. In 1953, it was nominated as one of the first key schools in Shanghai.

The incumbent principal of Shanghai Shixi High School, Dong Junwu (Chinese: 董君武), graduated from East China Normal University with a master's degree in mathematics. The school has a teaching team of five professional special-grade teachers and 78 middle special-grade teachers: its research groups include Chinese, Mathematics, English, and Physics. The high school is honored as the "Municipal Experimental School on Biology and Life Science Courses".

Shanghai Shixi High runs a boarding school program which enrolls outstanding junior school students and students of music or sports. The school actively participates in international academic research programs such as "Project Healthy Youth" organized by UNESCO. It has also established relationships with schools in Germany, UK, Australia, Japan, and Hong Kong.

Partner schools include Dartford Grammar School (England), St. Peters College (Australia), and Verde Valley School (Sedona, Arizona, USA).

In February 2005, eight Chinese students and two staff from the school visited England for 11 days and spent most of their time at St. Mary's Catholic High School, Menston. Since 2009, the school has partaken in exchange programs with St. Peter's College.

History

1870–1946 
Shanghai Shixi High School originated from the "Eurasia School" (Chinese: 欧亚侨童学校) founded by Catherine V. R. Bonney in 1870, a coeducational secondary school serving the orphans of both European and Asian lineage. Eurasia School was founded to provide a school for mixed-race children in Shanghai. It was originally located on Miller Street (Chinese: 密勒路), now Er'mei Road (Chinese: 峨眉路). As Bonney's cause was appreciated by both locals and foreigners, the school gained support from Thomas Hanbury (1832–1907), an English merchant and philanthropist. It expanded its campus and renewed its facilities due to Hanbury's donation. In 1882, Hanbury suggested that the school's operations should be supervised by the Shanghai Municipal Council, but was rejected by the council due to unknown reasons; nevertheless, the council granted some allowance to maintain school operations. In 1890 the council officially took over the school, which had been renamed "Hanbury Elementary School" (Chinese: 汉璧礼蒙养学堂). One year later, "Hanbury Elementary School" moved to No. 15 Bone Road (Chinese: 蓬路), now Tang'gu Road (Chinese: 塘沽路), with a larger and more diverse student body.

In 1911, the Municipal Council expanded its territory westward, which later contributed to the paving of Yuyuan Road (Chinese: 愚园路), where the present campus is located. The school's supervision was transferred to the Municipal Council the following year. The council, as the sole sponsor of the school (and thus claiming all responsibilities), formally hired the faculties as its employees. In 1914, "Hanbury Elementary School" was no longer co-educational after it was divided into separate single-sex schools: Hanbury Public School for Boys was relocated to No. 63 Haskell Road (Chinese: 赫司克尔路) in 1917. The School for Girls, in contrast, remained until 1935 when it merged with Shanghai Public School for Girls on Bone Road and moved to Hainan Road. Later, in 1943, it moved again to the main campus of Shanghai Public Schools for Girls (Chinese: 西童公学女校) on Yuyuan Road. The new institution was named "The Public & Hanbury School for Girls" (Chinese: 公立暨汉璧礼西童女校).

The origin of Shanghai Public Schools (Chinese: 西童公学) derived from The Shanghai Public School (Chinese: 上海公学), founded in 1886 by the Freemasons, which changed its Chinese name to "西童公学" (lit. "the school for Westerners"). Shanghai Public School was separated into single-sex schools in 1914, with the School for Boys (Chinese: 西童公学男校) on No.28 Bone Road and latter No. 200 North Sichuan Road (Chinese: 四川北路), and its girl division on Yuyuan Road. It was noteworthy that the School for Girls (Chinese: 西童公学女校) opened another two branch campuses on Bone Road since 1924 and Gongping Road (Chinese: 公平路) since 1926 that later moved to No. 17 Yulin Road. 

In July 1923, The Public School for Girls started to build its main campus on what is now the site of Shixi High School, and its primary address was 18B Yuyuan Road. The address was changed to No. 70 Yuyuan Road in 1924. The Public School for Girls merged with Hanbury School for Girls in 1935 and then relocated to No. 10 Hainan Road (Chinese: 海南路). Following the outbreak of the Pacific War in 1942, the Japanese army took over the Shanghai International Settlement. Every foreign school north of the Suzhou River was forced into West Shanghai, and "The Public & Hanbury School for Boys" (Chinese: 公立暨汉璧礼西童男校) was relocated to No. 10 Tifong Road (Chinese: 地丰路), now Urumqi Road (Chinese: 乌鲁木齐路).

In 1943, the Japanese army confiscated the campuses of both schools on Yuyuan Road and used them as the concentration camps for the Westerners. During the time of the Japanese occupation, the Public School for Boys was split into primary and secondary sections, and moved respectively to No. 851 Yuyuan Road and No. 178 Jufu Road (Chinese: 巨福路). Likewise, the School for Girls was forced to share the campus of the primary section. The concentration camps were dismissed in 1945 at the end of the war; therefore, both schools were able to move back to their former campus. In 1946, the Nationalist Government ordered both schools to merge and the name "Shixi High School" (Chinese: 市西中学) was officially granted. Zhao Chuanjia (Chinese: 赵传家) assumed the position of the school principal.

1946–present 
In the immediate years following the end of WW2, the newly-founded Shixi High School has experienced a hard time due to the lack of fund. When Shanghai was taken over by the People's Liberation Army in 1949, the People's Government of Shanghai transformed the school system into its current state. In 1953, Shanghai Shixi High School was appointed by the People's Government as one of the first key high schools in Shanghai, which was renamed an experimental model high school. Shanghai Shixi High School was awarded the honor of "Advanced Unit of Education" in 1980. In 1991 and 1998, the school was the experiment base of two education reforms of Shanghai. In 2012, the school finished expanding and refurbishing its campus, enhanced the infrastructure, and unveiled the "Thinking Plaza" (Chinese: 思维广场). The first two school scholarships, "Doctrina" (Chinese: 好学奖) and "Labore" (Chinese: 力行奖) were created. Former US President Jimmy Carter, held a talk to students during his visit to the campus. The Alumni Committee was founded in 2015 when it held its first convocation. The Education Development Fund of Shixi High School was set up in July, 2015.

On 6 October 2016, Shixi High School celebrated its 70th anniversary.

School symbols

School emblem 
The school emblem, known as the school coat of arms, of Shanghai Shixi High School is a rectangular shield gules, with a monogrammed "S" argent tangled to form an "X", which represents the acronym of the school. The highly stylized initials symbolize flame, saplings and sea gulls, which respectively stand for the zeal and devotion of faculty, the educational idea of the school as well as high purposes and dauntlessness of Shixi students.

School song 
The Alma Mater of Shanghai Shixi High School, commonly dubbed the "Alma Mater", was composed in 1946 by Wang Lifang. The original tune was by American composer E.L. Ashford. The lyrics were written by the faculty and student body in the 1940s and one sentence in the lyrics was altered in the 1980s to remove its touch of the colonial background of the school. The Alma Mater is in tempo di marcia and is of a religious style. This march is typically performed right after the National Anthem of China.

Campus 
The campus is located in the historical downtown area where villas and row houses from the 1920s and 1930s dominate. The buildings on the campus are incorporated into such a complex. The western part of what is now Shixi High School used to be the campus of Shanghai First Normal College (now Shanghai Normal University), and currently accommodates Shixi Middle School, an adjunct yet independent junior school to the high school.

Chuanjia Hall 
Chuanjia Hall (Chinese: 传家楼), built in 1934, is amongst the halls built before the school was renamed to Shixi. The four-storey block is coated in crimson. It was originally the main building for the Public School for Boys in the West City. The building was confiscated by the Japanese during WWII and used as a concentration camp to detain foreigners in Shanghai. It was the first building bequeathed to Shixi High School in 1946. A grand renovation in 2012 restored its art-deco interior.

Chuanjia Hall is named in honor of the late principal Zhao Chuanjia (1897–1993). It is customarily called the Front Hall due to its location on campus. The building accommodates classrooms for Grade 10, Plaza of Thinking, and several labs.

Haoxue & Lixing Halls 
The eight-storey tall building complex, Haoxue & Living Halls (Chinese: 好学力行楼), was completed in the late 20th century. It was originally painted in crimson to match Chuanjia Hall, but was refinished with grey cobblestones after the restoration in 2012.

The complex comprises two parts: Haoxue Hall (Chinese: 好学楼) and Lixing Hall(Chinese: 力行楼). The former accommodates classrooms for Grades 11 and 12 and the executive offices of the school. The latter hosts the Main Hall, science labs, and computer rooms. There is a rooftop garden on the complex. The building was colloquially called the Back Hall given its relative location on campus.

Arts & Humanities Complex 
Constructed in 2012, the Arts & Humanities Complex (Chinese: 人文艺术楼) is the newest structure on the campus. The complex has a similar color as the Doctrina et Labore Building since they were refurbished almost concurrently.

The Arts & Humanities Complex is now the supporting centre for Arts Faculty, and typically hosts performances, exhibitions, and school choir rehearsals. The music hall inside the complex is also used for Alumni Association meetings and student union sessions.

Second Hall 
Built in 1922, it is currently occupied by the Shixi Middle School, the junior division of Shixi school system. The building was designated an Excellent Historical Building (EHB) by the municipal government of Shanghai in 2015.

Other facilities 
Several auxiliary facilities are located on campus, including an underground café, a sports centre (with basketball field and gymnasium), and a swimming pool. Faculty members dine in a separate public canteen next to Chuanjia Hall.

The International Division is located in the north part of the campus, with a dedicated complex of buildings.

Although Shixi High School is technically not a boarding school, a small number of students do reside at the school and are accommodated by a dormitory outside the main campus.

School publications 
Shanghai Shixi High School issues its newspaper, Flying Shixi (Chinese: 飞翔市西) periodically, a journal that is edited and printed by the Newspaper Club and occasionally opens a column to public contribution. The reports and editorials focus primarily on the ongoing events taking place within a month to its publication, and those who contribute to the paper usually write on various campus or personal issues and remarks. The newspaper is supervised by the Committee Secretary of the school.

Along with the newspaper, the Literature Club also publicize a magazine named Frost (Chinese: 携霜),but was suspended due for unknown reasons after its debut issue.

Principals  
Shanghai Shixi High School has gone through six terms of administration. Zhao Chuanjia, the first principal of the school, also served as the Chancellor of the school from 1984 to 1993, a title that has remained vacant since.

References

Schools in Shanghai
High schools in Shanghai